Mark Knowles and Daniel Nestor were the defending champions but lost in the quarterfinals to Leander Paes and David Rikl.

Wayne Ferreira and Yevgeny Kafelnikov won in the final 3–6, 7–5, 6–4 against Bob Bryan and Mike Bryan.

Seeds
All eight seeded teams received byes to the second round.

Draw

Final

Top half

Bottom half

External links
 2003 Pacific Life Open Men's Doubles draw

Men's Doubles